Paul Mark Reid (born 18 February 1982) is an English former professional footballer who was previously Head of Youth Development and Academy Director at Sunderland before leaving the role on 30 June 2020. 

He started his career with Carlisle United, where his performances in the 1999–2000 season won him a £1,000,000 move to Rangers. He never played a first-team game for Rangers, and instead spent time on loan at Preston North End and Northampton Town, before he was signed by Northampton for a £150,000 fee in June 2003. He was sold on to Barnsley for a fee of £200,000 in July 2004, and captained the club to promotion out of League One via the play-offs in 2006. He was frozen out of the first-team picture in the 2007–08 season, and was loaned out to Carlisle United before he signed with Colchester United in July 2008. In January 2011, he was sold to Scunthorpe United for a fee of around £150,000.

Club career

Carlisle United
Reid started his career with Martin Wilkinson's Carlisle United, making his debut as a 53rd-minute substitute for Rob Bowman in a 1–0 defeat to Hartlepool United at Victoria Park on 22 January 2000. He started his first game three days later, as the "Cumbrians" beat Wigan Athletic 2–1 in the Football League Trophy at Brunton Park. He kept his first team place for the Third Division clash with Mansfield Town four days later, and went on to finish the 1999–2000 season with 22 appearances to his name. Carlisle narrowly clung onto their Football League status, finishing above last-placed Chester City on goal difference.

Rangers
Having been courted by Arsenal, Liverpool and Leeds United, he was signed by Dick Advocaat, manager of Scottish Premier League champions Rangers, for an initial £1,000,000 fee in June 2000. After Reid joined Rangers, former Carlisle teammate Shaun Teale stated that he "has got everything in his game to go right to the top and become a huge star. He uses the ball well, is very quick and is a tall lad who is excellent in the air." However, he also voiced concerns that moving to a big club at such a young age could stifle his development. Reid never took to the field in a competitive game at Ibrox, and after Alex McLeish was appointed as boss in December 2001, he was allowed to move out on loan.

His first loan spell was with First Division side Preston North End in January 2002. He made his debut on 5 February, and scored a goal in a 4–2 win over Sheffield Wednesday at Deepdale. However manager David Moyes never picked him again, and he ended the 2001–02 season without any further first team appearances.

Northampton Town
In January 2003, Reid joined Northampton Town on loan until the end of the 2002–03 season. He played 19 games as the "Cobblers" were relegated out of the Second Division with a last-place finish. He impressed manager Martin Wilkinson, who took him to Sixfields on a permanent basis for a £150,000 fee in June 2003.

In August 2003 he was appointed as club captain on the field, whilst Paul Trollope served as captain in off the field matters. New boss Colin Calderwood led Northampton to the Third Division play-offs in 2003–04. Northampton drew 3–3 with Mansfield Town in the play-off semi-finals; Reid scored his penalty in the subsequent shoot-out at Field Mill, but a miss from Eric Sabin allowed Mansfield to advance with a 5–4 win.

Barnsley
In July 2004, Reid joined Paul Hart's Barnsley on a two-year contract for a fee of around £200,000. He scored on his debut on 7 August, scoring Barnsley's first goal of the season-opening 1–1 draw with Milton Keynes Dons at the National Hockey Stadium. He played 44 games in the 2004–05 season, helping the club to a 13th-place finish in League One.

New manager Andy Ritchie appointed Reid as club captain in August 2005. He missed five weeks of the start of the 2005–06 campaign after picking up a hamstring injury, this injury coupled with his disciplinary record of seven yellow cards and two red cards limited him to 33 league games throughout the campaign. He managed to take part in the play-offs however, and his headed goal against Huddersfield Town in the second leg of the semi-finals at the Galpharm Stadium helped to take the "Tykes" into the 2006 play-off final. He played all 120 minutes of the final at the Millennium Stadium, helping Barnsley to secure promotion with a penalty shoot-out victory over Swansea City following a 2–2 draw.

He signed a new two-year contract in June 2006. He played 37 Championship matches in the 2006–07 season, and remained a key member of the defense as new boss Simon Davey led the club to eight points above the relegation zone.

Reid signed a new two-year contract in May 2007. On 18 August, he was sent off for an alleged elbow on Colchester United striker Teddy Sheringham. This was his last appearance for the club, aside from a few more minutes as a late substitute a month later. Davey confirmed Reid's time at Oakwell had come to an end when he placed Reid on the transfer-list in January 2008, alongside Nick Colgan and Andy Johnson.

Reid returned to League One with former club Carlisle United on loan on 27 March 2008 until the end of the season as the "Blues" looked for cover in the last eight games of their push for promotion to the Championship. He played just 45 minutes in his loan spell. He was released by Barnsley in June 2008, after having his contract terminated by mutual consent.

Colchester United
In July 2008, he signed a contract with League One club Colchester United. He formed a strong partnership with Pat Baldwin in the 2008–09 season. He was threatened with legal action by manager Jim Gannon in October after a challenge on Matty McNeil left McNeil with concussion; Gannon said that "We are collecting all the evidence and presenting it to the police. It's up to them to take criminal proceedings against the player in question." In the latter half of the campaign, he faced competition for his first team place at the Colchester Community Stadium form fellow defenders Pat Baldwin, Chris Coyne and Matt Heath.

Paul Lambert was replaced as manager by Aidy Boothroyd at the start of the 2009–10 season, who preferred to play a near ever-present Magnus Okuonghae alongside one of Reid, Heath and Danny Batth. Reid played just 14 games throughout the campaign.

He was returned to the starting line-up by new manager John Ward in the 2010–11 season, making 21 appearances before he was sold midway through the season.

Scunthorpe United
In January 2011, Reid joined Scunthorpe United for an undisclosed fee, believed to be in the region of £150,000; he signed a two-and-a-half-year deal. He played 12 games for the "Iron" in what remained of the 2010–11 campaign, as Scunthorpe dropped into League One out of the Championship.

He played 38 games in the 2011–12 season, as Alan Knill's side finished in the lower half of the table after a disappointing campaign.

Reid lost his first team place at Glanford Park to David Mirfin in the 2012–13 season. He made 27 appearances in the 2012–13 campaign, as United were relegated into League Two. Reid was one of seven senior players not to be offered new contracts in the summer.

He had a trial at League One side Port Vale in July 2013.

Return to Northampton Town
On 27 September 2013, Reid returned to former club Northampton Town on a contract until late January 2014.

Eastleigh
On 17 June 2014, Reid signed for newly promoted to the Conference Premier side Eastleigh on a 2-year contract after being released from Northampton Town.

Whitehawk
On 16 September 2016, Reid signed for Brighton-based National League South side Whitehawk, to play under his former boss at Eastleigh, Richard Hill. After Hill left the club to join Aston Villa as a scout in November 2016, Reid was appointed as joint interim manager, while continuing as a player. This appointment was confirmed until the end of the season on 22 December  but with the Hawks in the bottom three at the end of January, the club advertised for a new permanent manager, retaining Reid as a player. On 9 March 2017 Whitehawk announced that Reid had left the club by mutual consent. He played his last match for Whitehawk in a 1–0 victory against Welling United on 4 March 2017.

International career
In 2000 Reid represented his country at Under 18 and England under-19 team and was capped against the Netherlands. He was named in the England under-20 squad in March 2002.

Career statistics

Honours
with Barnsley
Football League One play-off winner: 2006

References

External links
 
 

1982 births
Living people
Footballers from Carlisle, Cumbria
English footballers
England youth international footballers
Association football defenders
Carlisle United F.C. players
Rangers F.C. players
Preston North End F.C. players
Northampton Town F.C. players
Barnsley F.C. players
Colchester United F.C. players
Scunthorpe United F.C. players
Eastleigh F.C. players
Whitehawk F.C. players
English Football League players
Whitehawk F.C. managers
English football managers